Adam Ennafati (born 29 June 1994) is a Moroccan professional footballer who plays for FAR Rabat on loan from Emirates as a winger.

Career

Club
Ennafati's professional career as a footballer started in French Lille OSC reserve team, Lille OSC B after the club completed the signing of the player from AM Football on 7 February 2012 in a five-year contract. The deal was completed on 1 July 2012. Ennafati stay at the Championnat de France amateur side didn't last long, as he moved to his hometown club FUS Rabat in July 2014 after spending just 2 years in France. He scored only 3 goals and played 22 appearances in his first season with club, he also received a 2014 Moroccan Throne Cup winners medal. The next season wasn't much different for Ennafati, as he scored only 2 goals in 17 appearances with the club but he helped the club to win the Botola title for the first time in the club's history. In the following season, 2016–17 season, Ennafati scored 1 goal from 17 appearances with club, his only goal that season was in a 2–1 win against league champions Wydad Casablanca.

On 17 August 2017, Ennafati was loaned to Olympique Khouribga in a one-year deal, with Olympique Khouribga having an option to make the transfer permanent at the end of the season. He scored his first goal with Khouribga in a league match against Moghreb Tétouan on 8 December 2017.

International
Ennafati represented Morocco at U17, U20, U23 and senior level. He appeared in many tournaments with the youth teams, including the 2013 Mediterranean Games Football Tournament and 2015 Toulon Tournament, where he showed great performance in the tournament in both group stage and the final against France, where he scored the only goal for his team as they lost 1–3. He played only 1 match with the senior team in a friendly match against Gabon on 3 May 2014.

Honours

Clubs
FUS Rabat / As far rabat 
 Botola: 2015–16
 Moroccan Throne Cup: 2014 -2015 / 2020-2021

International
Morocco
 Mediterranean Games Football Tournament: 2013
 Islamic Solidarity Games Football Tournament: 2013
 Chan : 2020-2021

References

External links

1994 births
Living people
Moroccan footballers
Footballers from Rabat
Morocco international footballers
Morocco youth international footballers
Association football wingers
Moroccan expatriate footballers
Championnat National 2 players
Botola players
UAE Pro League players
Lille OSC players
Fath Union Sport players
Olympique Club de Khouribga players
MC Oujda players
Emirates Club players
AS FAR (football) players
Moroccan expatriate sportspeople in France
Expatriate footballers in France
Moroccan expatriate sportspeople in the United Arab Emirates
Expatriate footballers in the United Arab Emirates
Competitors at the 2013 Mediterranean Games
Mediterranean Games competitors for Morocco
Mediterranean Games gold medalists for Morocco
Mediterranean Games medalists in football
2020 African Nations Championship players
Morocco A' international footballers